The River Etherow is a river in northern England, and a tributary of the River Goyt. Although now passing through South Yorkshire, Derbyshire and Greater Manchester, it historically formed the ancient county boundary between Cheshire and Derbyshire. The upper valley is known as Longdendale.

Course

Rising in the Redhole Spring and Wike Head area of Pikenaze Moor in Derbyshire, the river broadens into the Longdendale Chain of reservoirs in the Peak District National Park. It emerges again in Tintwistle, Derbyshire, at the foot of Bottoms Reservoir dam and passes Melandra Castle in Gamesley, where it is joined by Glossop Brook.  The Etherow enters the borough of Tameside at Hollingworth in Greater Manchester, passing into Stockport where it passes through Etherow Country Park. It flows into the River Goyt at Brabyns Park near Marple.

However, older definitions, and many older maps, place its start at the confluence of the Etherow and Goyt; for example the 1911 Encyclopædia Britannica states "It is formed by the junction of the Goyt and the Etherow a short distance below Marple in Cheshire on the first-named stream." John Stockdale's map published on 12 April 1794 shows the Mersey River extending to at least Mottram, and forming the boundary between Cheshire and Derbyshire.

Natural history

The upper reaches of the River Etherow pass through peat moorland, inhabited by red foxes, voles and an introduced population of mountain hare.  Red grouse, ring ouzel, wheatear and golden plover may be seen.  Kestrels, merlins and short-eared owls nest here. The reservoirs attract mallards, and also teal, pochard, common sandpipers, black-headed gulls and Canada geese. The woodlands are home to redstart, great spotted woodpecker, and spotted flycatcher. Water rail have been recorded at Etherow Country Park.

Geology

Longdendale is a steep-sided V-shaped valley that is glacial in origin. Longdendale is in the Dark Peak, where a thick blanket of peat overlies the Millstone Grit sandstone, formed on a bed of shale through which flows the Etherow. Directly beneath the upper valley lie areas of Carboniferous Millstone Grit, shales and sandstone. It is on the edge of the Peak District Dome, at the southern edge of the Pennine anticline. The Variscan uplift has caused much faulting and Glossopdale was the product of glacial action in the last glaciation period that exploited the weakened rocks. The steep-sided valleys of the cloughs cause significant erosion and deposition. The layers of sandstone, mudstones and shale in the bedrock act as an aquifer to feed the springs. The valley bottoms have a thin deposit of boulder clay. The brooks are fed by the peaty soils of the moors and are, therefore, acidic (pH5.5–7.0).

History
The Etherow valley was an important trans-Pennine route, and in AD 78 the Romans under Agricola built the fort of Ardotalia (later known as Melandra or Melandra Castle) to defend it. The Mercians settled at Hollingworth about 650 AD. Many placenames of the area date from this period; for example, Mottram and Glossop. At the time of Domesday (1086) the river was firmly established as the boundary between Cheshire and Derbyshire, but the name Edrow or Etherow applied to this upper reach of the Mersey cannot be dated earlier than c.1772.

A packhorse route (known as a saltway) was maintained from the Middle Ages onwards to allow the export of salt from the Cheshire towns of Nantwich, Northwich and Middlewich across the Pennines. The saltway followed the Etherow to Ladyshaw, and at Salters Brook it forked, with one route leading to Wakefield and another to Barnsley.

Water was an important source of power for industry, and the Etherow and its tributaries were fast flowing and constant. Watermills were used to grind meal and to full woollen cloth (Littlemoor 1781). Wool was transported along the turnpike road (1731) that ran from Ashton-under-Lyne, Stalybridge, Mottram, Woodhead and Lady's Cross to Sheffield, to be woven on hand-looms in the dale.

From 1782 to 1820, water-powered cotton mills were built along many brooks feeding the Etherow, including six on the Glossop side of the river. With the adoption of steam to power the ever-larger mills, built closer to the coal fields, the river assumed a new role as a source of water for Manchester and Salford. In 1844 John Frederick Bateman advised Manchester Corporation that the River Etherow, which rose at the highest point of the Pennine chain, could provide water, collected in purpose-built reservoirs, "nearly as pure as if it comes from the heavens."  This led to the construction of the Longdendale Chain of reservoirs, the first scheme of its type in the world. Three reservoirs were built on the Etherow to impound drinking water, with another two to provide compensation water for the mills downstream.

Etymology
The name Etherow could be of Brittonic Celtic origin and derived from the ancient term *ador, meaning "watercourse, channel". The settlement-name Tintwistle, however, implies that Etherow may be an Old English replacement for an earlier name of the *Tin- type (see River Tyne), derived from the hydronym *edre, which is possibly related to ēdre, "vein".

Economy

Woodhead railway line

The Woodhead Line, which followed the river from Hadfield to the Woodhead Tunnel portal, was an important cross-Pennine route built in 1844 by the Sheffield, Ashton-under-Lyne and Manchester Railway. Though now closed to railway traffic, one tunnel is used to route electricity cables for the National Grid, with work in progress to use a second tunnel for a new cable, thus preventing the re-establishment of rail traffic.

Recreation

Walking and cycling

Following the closure of the railway line, the trackbed was taken up and the Longdendale Trail constructed along its route. This is now part of the Trans-Pennine Trail,  Sustrans National Cycle Route 62. This, in its turn, is part of the  European walking route E8 from Liverpool to Istanbul. The Pennine Way crosses Longdendale, descending from Bleaklow to the south and ascending Black Hill to the north. The youth hostel at Crowden is a traditional stop after the first day's walking, from Edale.

The circular walk known as 'The Longdendale Edges' takes in the high ground (at about the - level) on both sides of the valley. The detailed route, clockwise from Crowden Youth Hostel, is given in Peak District Walking Guide No.2, published by the Peak Park Planning Board.

Sailing
Torside Reservoir is home to Glossop & District Sailing Club and Etherow Country Park is the home to Etherow Country Park Sailing Club.

Country Park

Etherow Country Park, in Compstall, close to the mouth of the Etherow, opened in 1968 as one of the UK's first country parks.  Originally it was an industrial area incorporating a mine, a mill and a mill pond. The River Etherow flows through the park and is the source for the mill pond. Etherow Country Park is associated with many local groups, including a small local community group, the Friends of Etherow, anglers, the afore-mentioned sailing club, and a model boat club.

Compstall Nature Reserve is a  region of the park which is designated a Site of Special Scientific Interest (SSSI). The area was given the designation in 1977 for its biological interest, in particular its wide range of habitats, including open water, tall fen, reed swamp, carr and mixed deciduous woodland.

Tributaries and route map 

The Etherow has no major tributaries; it is fed by numerous brooks and streams from the cloughs flowing off Kinder Scout, Bleaklow and Black Hill. Minor left tributaries are:
Black Clough
Shining Clough
Wildboar Clough
Torside Clough
Glossop Brook
Shell Brook
Hurst Brook
Gnats Hole Brook
Chisworth Brook
Mortin Clough

Minor right tributaries are:
Salters Brook
Heyden Brook
Crowden Brook
Hollingworth Brook
Arnfield Brook
Ogden Brook
Gigg Brook

See also
Rivers of the United Kingdom
List of mills in Longdendale and Glossopdale

References

Notes

Bibliography

External links

The United Kingdom Acid Waters Monitoring Network Site Number 12

Rivers of Derbyshire
Rivers of Greater Manchester
Rivers and valleys of the Peak District
Rivers of the Metropolitan Borough of Stockport
1Etherow